"Face to Face" is a song written by Randy Owen and recorded by American country music group Alabama.  It was released in December 1987 as the second single from the album Just Us.  The song featured K.T. Oslin on guest vocals, although she was not credited, and was Alabama's twenty-second number one on the country chart.  The single went to number one for one week and spent fifteen weeks on the country chart.

"Face to Face" is one of two singles released by Alabama to feature a female vocalist.

Charts

Weekly charts

Year-end charts

References

1987 singles
1987 songs
Alabama (American band) songs
Song recordings produced by Harold Shedd
RCA Records singles
Songs written by Randy Owen
K. T. Oslin songs